Smith Township is one of fifteen townships in Greene County, Indiana, USA.  As of the 2010 census, its population was 383.

Geography
The stream of Hall Branch runs through this township.

Unincorporated towns
 Lone Tree
(This list is based on USGS data and may include former settlements.)

Adjacent townships
 Harrison Township, Clay County (north)
 Jefferson Township, Owen County (northeast)
 Jefferson Township (east)
 Fairplay Township (southeast)
 Grant Township (south)
 Stockton Township (southwest)
 Wright Township (west)
 Lewis Township, Clay County (northwest)

Cemeteries
The township contains four cemeteries: Bohley, Campbell, Fuller and Scafford Prairie.

Major highways

References
 U.S. Board on Geographic Names (GNIS)
 United States Census Bureau cartographic boundary files

External links
 Indiana Township Association
 United Township Association of Indiana

Townships in Greene County, Indiana
Bloomington metropolitan area, Indiana
Townships in Indiana